Shufa is a Palestinian village in the Tulkarm Governorate in the eastern West Bank, located 6 kilometers South-east of Tulkarm. According to the Palestinian Central Bureau of Statistics, Shufa had a population of approximately 1,253 inhabitants in mid-year 2006. 5.4% of the population of Shufa were refugees in 1997. The healthcare facilities for Shufa are at Kafr al-Labad or Saffarin where the facilities are designated as MOH level 2.

History
Ceramics from the Byzantine era have been found here.

Ottoman era
Shufa, like all of Palestine was incorporated into the Ottoman Empire in 1517.  In the 1596  tax registers,  it was named Sufa, part of the nahiya ("subdistrict") of Jabal Sami, part of the larger Sanjak of Nablus. It had a population of 8 households, all Muslims. The inhabitants paid a fixed tax rate of 33,3% on agricultural products, including wheat, barley, summer crops, olive trees,  goats and beehives, in addition to occasional revenues and a press for olive oil or grape syrup, and a fixed tax for people of Nablus area; a total of 3,202  akçe.

In 1838, it was noted as a village, Shaufeh in the Wady esh-Sha'ir district, west of Nablus.

In 1870 Victor Guérin noted the village on a hilltop, and taking it as equal importance as Saffarin.

In 1882 the PEF's Survey of Western Palestine (SWP)  described Shufeh as: "A small stone village, in a strong position on a ridge, with steep slopes north and south. It is supplied by a well in the village, and has a few olives below it. A good view is obtained from it over the plain, and the country north and south, as well as to the range north of Sebustieh."

British Mandate era
In the 1922 census of Palestine conducted  by the British Mandate authorities, Shufeh had a population of 207 Muslims, increasing in the 1931 census to 259 Muslims, living in 47 houses.

In the 1945 statistics the population of Shufa was 370 Muslims,  with  11,690  dunams of land  according to an official land and population survey. Of this, 4,315  dunams were used for cereals, while 6 dunams were built-up (urban) land.

Jordanian era
In the wake of the 1948 Arab–Israeli War, and after the 1949 Armistice Agreements, Shufa came  under Jordanian rule.

In 1961, the population was  503.

Post 1967
Since the Six-Day War in 1967, Shufa has been under Israeli occupation.

See also
Peasants' revolt in Palestine
Omer Goldman
List of violent incidents in the Israeli–Palestinian conflict, January–June 2015

Footnotes

Bibliography

External links
 Welcome To Shufa
Survey of Western Palestine, Map 11:    IAA, Wikimedia commons

Villages in the West Bank
Tulkarm Governorate
Municipalities of the State of Palestine